Yoro is a crater in the Oxia Palus quadrangle of Mars.  It was named after the town of Yoro in Honduras in 1976.

Yoro lies within a ring of hills that are probably the remnants of a larger crater that has become buried and eroded.  The larger crater Libertad is west of Yoro.

References 

Oxia Palus quadrangle
Impact craters on Mars